Kunde Hospital (sometimes Khunde Hospital) is a hospital in the town of Kunde, Nepal, that serves 8,000 people from Khumbu district. The hospital was funded and operated by The Himalayan Trust until 1976 and is now supported by the Sir Edmund Hillary Foundation.

History

After Hillary climbed Everest in 1953, he led many further expeditions to Nepal. From the early 1960s, these expeditions had a focus on  improving the health and social welfare of the people of Nepal, including the improvement of water supplies, the building of schools, bridges and an airstrip at Lukla, and the provision of medical care and a programme of vaccination against smallpox. 

In 1966, Hillary, with overseas volunteers and local people, built the hospital at Kunde. The hospital opened on December 18, 1966, when Dr John McKinnon and Diane McKinnon, of New Zealand, became the first volunteer couple to staff the hospital. The hospital was initially staffed by overseas volunteers from New Zealand and Canada, provided through the Volunteer Service Abroad organisation and later by The Himalayan Trust and the Sir Edmund Hillary Foundation Canada. Canadian doctor Joan Ford was one such overseas doctor who provided services at the hospital. 

Since 2002, it has been wholly staffed and run by local people.  The hospital has 12 beds.

References

Hospital buildings completed in 1966
Hospitals in Nepal
Hospitals established in 1966
1966 establishments in Nepal